The Way is the eighth full-length studio album by American recording artist Macy Gray, released on October 7, 2014 on Kobalt Records. The record follows her Stevie Wonder tribute album Talking Book. Gray supported the album with a North American and Australian tour. The album was molded around the idea that there is little music in today's mainstream for a mature audience.

Critical reception

The Way received generally positive reviews from music critics. At Metacritic, which assigns a normalized rating out of 100 to reviews from mainstream critics, the album received an average score of 63, based on 5 reviews, which indicates "generally favorable reviews".

Track listing

Chart history

References

2014 albums
Macy Gray albums
Rock albums by American artists